The 1975–76 North American Hockey League season was the third season of the North American Hockey League. 10 teams participated in the regular season, and the Philadelphia Firebirds were the league champions.

Regular season

Lockhart Cup-Playoffs

External links
 Statistics on hockeydb.com

North American Hockey League (1973–1977) seasons
NAHL
NAHL